Sava Ranđelović (born 17 July 1993) is a Serbian water polo player for VasasPlaket and the Serbia men's national water polo team.

Representing Serbia, he won European Championship gold medals in 2014, 2016, and 2018. He also won a gold medal at the World Championships in 2015, and Olympic gold medals in 2016 and 2020.

See also
 Serbia men's Olympic water polo team records and statistics
 List of Olympic champions in men's water polo
 List of Olympic medalists in water polo (men)
 List of world champions in men's water polo
 List of World Aquatics Championships medalists in water polo

References

External links

 
 Sava Ranđelović at VK Crvena zvezda 

1993 births
Living people
Sportspeople from Niš
Serbian male water polo players
Water polo centre backs
Water polo players at the 2016 Summer Olympics
Water polo players at the 2020 Summer Olympics
Medalists at the 2016 Summer Olympics
Medalists at the 2020 Summer Olympics
Olympic gold medalists for Serbia in water polo
World Aquatics Championships medalists in water polo
European champions for Serbia
Competitors at the 2018 Mediterranean Games
Mediterranean Games medalists in water polo
Mediterranean Games gold medalists for Serbia
Universiade medalists in water polo
Universiade gold medalists for Serbia
Serbian expatriate sportspeople in Italy
Medalists at the 2017 Summer Universiade
21st-century Serbian people